is a German word usually translated as captain when it is used as an officer's rank in the German, Austrian, and Swiss armies. While  in contemporary German means 'main', it also has and originally had the meaning of 'head', i.e.  literally translates to 'head-man', which is also the etymological root of captain (from Latin , 'head').
It equates to the rank of captain in the British and US Armies, and is rated OF-2 in NATO.  Currently there is no female form, like Hauptfrau within the military, the correct form of address is "Frau Hauptmann".

More generally, a Hauptmann can be the head of any hierarchically structured group of people, often as a compound word.

Since medieval times, both titles have been used for state administrators rather than military personnel.  may also be the origin of the title hetman, used in Central and Eastern Europe.

Austria

Germany

Rank insignia 

On the shoulder straps (Heer, Luftwaffe) there are three silver pips (stars).

Switzerland

Swiss Guard

See also
 World War II German Army ranks and insignia
 Ranks of the German Bundeswehr
 Rank insignia of the German Bundeswehr

References

External links
 Deutsches Wörterbuch, Hauptmann

Military ranks of Germany
Military ranks of Austria
Military ranks
German words and phrases